Lyubov Nikolaevna Tyurina (April 25, 1943 – October 23, 2015) was a volleyball player for the USSR.

References

2015 deaths
1943 births
Sportspeople from Moscow
Soviet women's volleyball players
Olympic volleyball players of the Soviet Union
Volleyball players at the 1972 Summer Olympics
Olympic gold medalists for the Soviet Union
Russian women's volleyball players
Olympic medalists in volleyball
Medalists at the 1972 Summer Olympics
Honoured Masters of Sport of the USSR